Luciana Camargo Tella (born 31 December 1969) is a former professional tennis player from Brazil.

Biography
Born in Campinas, Tella first appeared on the WTA Tour in the 1986 season and went on to reach a top ranking 154 in the world in singles.

At the 1988 French Open, she competed in the main draw of both the women's doubles and mixed doubles events.

She featured in a total of 19 Fed Cup ties for Brazil, which included World Group fixtures against Czechoslovakia in 1988 and Canada in 1989.

Her representative career included appearing at the 1995 Pan American Games in Mar del Plata, where she partnered with Andrea Vieira to win a bronze medal in the women's doubles.

Since 1998, she has run the Tella Tennis Academy in Campinas.

ITF Circuit finals

Singles: 15 (7–8)

Doubles: 24 (14–10)

References

External links
 
 
 

1969 births
Living people
Brazilian female tennis players
Sportspeople from Campinas
Tennis players at the 1995 Pan American Games
Pan American Games bronze medalists for Brazil
Pan American Games medalists in tennis
Medalists at the 1995 Pan American Games
20th-century Brazilian women
21st-century Brazilian women